10 Lafayette Square, also known as the Tishman Building, is a high-rise office tower located in Lafayette Square in Buffalo, New York. Completed in 1959, it is the thirteenth-tallest building in Buffalo, standing at 263 feet (80 m) and 20 stories tall. The building is located adjacent to the Rand Building and built in the International Style. The structural frames for the building are not steel, but concrete beams and columns. The building architects were Emery Roth & Sons of New York City.

Previous building
For 81 years (1876–1957), the six-story, cast iron, Buffalo German Insurance Company Building (a Second Empire-style office building built by Richard A. Waite) existed on current land site prior to the Tishman Building.

History
The Tishman building was home to the Fortune 500 company, National Fuel Gas (formerly Iroquois Gas) until 2003 when the company relocated to the Buffalo suburb of Williamsville.

In May 2011, the Amherst-based Hamister Group purchased the Tishman building. They spent $41 million renovating the building into a mixed use complex including the 123-room Hilton Garden Inn Buffalo Downtown, two floors of apartments, and three floors of office space.

It was added to the National Register of Historic Places in 2012, as the Tishman Building.

Gallery

See also
List of tallest buildings in Buffalo

References

External links

 10 Lafayette official website
 Hilton Garden Inn Buffalo Downtown official website
 Skyscraperpage building page
 Emporis building page

Office buildings on the National Register of Historic Places in New York (state)
Office buildings completed in 1959
International style architecture in New York (state)
Skyscraper office buildings in Buffalo, New York
Skyscrapers in Buffalo, New York
National Register of Historic Places in Buffalo, New York
Skyscraper office buildings in New York (state)
Residential skyscrapers in New York (state)
Skyscraper hotels in New York (state)
Emery Roth buildings